Bilacunaria is a genus of flowering plant in the family Apiaceae, with six species. It is native from the east Caucasus to West Asia.

References 

Apioideae
Apioideae genera